is a platform arcade game, produced and published in 1986 by SNK. Conversions were later released for the NES console and ZX Spectrum and Commodore 64 home computers.

The game's protagonist, Princess Athena, has gone on to appear in later fighting games by SNK as a secret character or assistant to her descendant Athena Asamiya, a frequent main character in these games.

Plot
Athena was the young, headstrong princess of the heavenly Kingdom of Victory. She was bored of the monotonous daily life in the palace and desired exciting adventures. One day, she opened the "Door Which Shouldn't Be Opened" in the basement of Castle Victory, said to lead to a savage and deadly place. As she dared cross the doorway, it caused her to fall from the skies and to another realm called Fantasy World, which was dominated by the evil Emperor Dante. After her flowing dress was lost while catching the wind for her fall, the perilous adventures of Princess Athena began as she landed in a wilderness overrun by beast-like warriors and more dangers than she could ever wish for. She readied to fight for her life and arm herself, with no other choice than to face the ruthless Dante and every obstacle on her way, to free this kingdom and make it back alive to her own.

After Athena defeats Dante, it all begins anew in the sequel, Athena: Full Throttle, in which the princess, again bored, opens the "Door Which Shouldn't Be Opened B", disregarding her loyal maid Helene's advice, and they both fall to Elysium World, where they face off against other villains.

Many of the game's elements are inspired by Greek mythology or ancient Roman culture such as weapons, equipment, items and enemy designs, while Princess Athena herself is named after the Greek goddess Athena.

Gameplay
Upon landing, unarmed and nearly nude, the princess only has her kicks to fend off the approaching monsters, but she may collect the dead enemies's various weapons and also has the chance to find shields, headgear and armor to cover her body, however, these will be lost after withstanding some attacks. Her journey requires leaping and climbing as well as fighting through the land's eight hazardous worlds, each leading up to an oversized enemy that must be dealt with before proceeding to the next area. The use of certain weapons such as a hammer allows Athena to break through stone blocks, sometimes revealing not only armor but magic items such as Mercury's sandals that, when worn, allow her to make great leaps.

The game features certain role-playing video game elements to complement the platform action. Princess Athena has to defeat enemies such as the final boss by using various mythological weapons, items and equipment. Without some items, she cannot make it through the adventure.

Ports 
Athena was later converted for the NES by Micronics. Conversions were also done for the ZX Spectrum and Commodore 64 in 1987 by Ocean Software and released under their Imagine label.

Only the NES version was released for North American homes until the PlayStation Network saw a release of the arcade original in 2011. Both the arcade and NES versions of Athena are included in SNK 40th Anniversary Collection, released for Nintendo Switch in 2018, and then in 2019 for PlayStation 4, Xbox One, and Windows.

The game was released on the Nintendo Switch in the Nintendo eShop on December 13, 2018, by Hamster Corporation as part of their Arcade Archives series and also on the PlayStation 4 on December 19 as part of the same series.

Reception 
In Japan, Game Machine listed Athena on their September 1, 1986, issue as being the ninth most-successful table arcade unit of the month.

Analysis 
The game has been described as one of the first cases where a video game received a playable female character.

Princess Athena in other games
Aside from Psycho Soldier introducing her modern-day descendant, Athena Asamiya, Princess Athena faded out of SNK's spotlight until fourteen years later, when she appeared as Athena Asamiya's 'Another Striker', a special helper character, in The King of Fighters 2000.

Afterwards, she becomes a secret boss in the dream match game SNK vs. Capcom: SVC Chaos as an angelic being guarding the entrance to the Heaven World, which is patterned after the stages from her video game. By contrast, the Capcom character Red Arremer as another secret boss guards the entrance to the Hell World.

Due to her defeat (caused by the player's character) in SVC Chaos, she is sent to the human world (Earth) by Kamisama for further training through the fighting tournament hosted by the organization WAREZ, in SNK's next dream match game NeoGeo Battle Coliseum, as a playable hidden character. Although NGBC gives exhaustive background stories to every character, it is not a canonical continuation to any of their original games (neither is SVC Chaos).

Also, aside from the above titles, she appears in the SNK vs. Capcom: Card Fighters Clash trading card game series, as an SNK character card or as an Action/Counter card, and, in the final Days of Memories game, she makes a cameo as a foreign cousin of Athena Asamiya.

See also

List of Famicom games
List of Nintendo Entertainment System games
SNK vs. Capcom (series)

References

External links

Athena at Arcade History
 Athena video game at Neo Geo Battle Coliseum official website

1986 video games
Athena games
Arcade video games
Cancelled Amstrad CPC games
Commodore 64 games
Nintendo Entertainment System games
Nintendo Switch games
Platform games
PlayStation Network games
PlayStation 4 games
SNK franchises
SNK games
SNK Playmore games
Video games scored by Martin Galway
Video games featuring female protagonists
ZX Spectrum games
Video games developed in Japan
Hamster Corporation games
Single-player video games